Sharjah Sustainable City is the first sustainably built city in Sharjah, United Arab Emirates. It currently spans 7.2 million square feet in Sharjah's Al Rahmaniya Area. The city was developed by Sharjah Investment and Development Authority (Shurooq) in partnership with Diamond Developers. It is divided into blocks of properties ranging from 2,035 square feet to 3,818 square feet, with a total of 1,250 sustainable properties.

The city is powered by renewable energy generated by rooftop solar panels and is constructed with sustainable materials. The designs are made to have low operating costs. It reuses 100% of its wastewater for landscape irrigation and maximizes recycling to divert waste from landfills. The city also produces chemical-free leafy greens and vegetables. With an emphasis on food security, the city hosts indoor farming facilities and partially solar-powered greenhouses that produce approximately 10,000 kg of chemical-free leafy greens and vegetables annually. 

The city is managed by a team led by the Chief Executive Officer, Yousif Ahmed Al-Mutawa.

History

The city was developed by Sharjah Investment and Development Authority (Shurooq) in partnership with Diamond Developers and is modelled after the ‘The Sustainable City’ in Dubai. It aims to become a fully sustainable and functioning city.

Awards
Awarded the ‘Best International Sustainable Residential Development’ and the ‘Best Sustainable Residential Development Arabia’ at the International Property Awards 2022-23.

References 

Planned cities in the United Arab Emirates
Proposed populated places
Sustainable urban planning
New towns started in the 2000s